Kurzawa is a Polish surname. It may refer to:
 Józef Kurzawa (1910–1940), Polish Roman Catholic priest
 Layvin Kurzawa (born 1992), French footballer
 Rafał Kurzawa (born 1993), Polish footballer

See also
 

Polish-language surnames